Bad Boys is a 2003 Finnish crime drama film directed by Aleksi Mäkelä, based on the story of a notorious real-life family of criminals known as "the Daltons of Eura". It was the second most successful film in Finnish theatres after The Lord of the Rings: The Return of the King in 2003, taking in $4,778,324. This makes the film one of the most successful Finnish films at the national box office of all time.

Cast
Peter Franzén as Otto Takkunen
Niko Saarela as Matti Takkunen
Lauri Nurkse as Ilkka Takkunen
Jasper Pääkkönen as Eero Takkunen
Vesa-Matti Loiri as Jouko Takkunen
Elsa Saisio as Pirjo Suutari
Risto Tuorila as Ensio Suutari
Hannu-Pekka Björkman as Muukkonen
Janna Herttuainen as Leena
Eero Milonoff as Aulis
Oiva Lohtander as Headteacher
Arttu Kapulainen as Timo
Eeva Litmanen as Tuulikki Suutari
Outi Mäenpää as Sirkka Takkunen

References

External links

2000s Finnish-language films
2003 films
Films directed by Aleksi Mäkelä
2003 crime drama films
Finnish crime drama films